The Flores Old Ground (also known as "Old Polo Ground" or "Old Polo Field" or "Flores Polo Ground") was the stadium of defunct Flores Athletic Club. Located in the barrio of Caballito, Buenos Aires, just behind the Buenos Aires Western Railway freight sheds, it hosted several polo, rugby union, association football and cricket matches during the period Flores A.C. was active.

History

By 1860 a big British community lived in the "porteños" neighborhoods of Caballito and Flores, with most of their members working in commerce activities. They usually spent summertime in their country houses located in Barracas, Belgrano and Flores, which was the favorite place of Argentine high society families to spend their free time. Some of the biggest palaces (such as "Miraflores", built in 1886 and currently a school, or "Las Lilas") had been erected in that zone.

Flores A.C. was established in the same lot where in 1875 the first polo match had been played in Argentina. The stadium was a multi-purposed venue, being used by the polo, rugby union and football teams from the club during the last years of the 19th century. The Old Ground was a recurrent venue not only for the Flores A.C. team (which played in Primera División from 1893 to 1897) but for other football teams such as Buenos Aires F.C. in 1891. Moreover, the first final match of Argentine football (between St. Andrew's and Old Caledonians) was held in the Old Ground.

The Old Ground was also used as home venue by the rugby union (as the club was one of the founding members of Argentine Rugby Union) and polo teams from the institution.

In fact, the first registered rugby union match played by Flores A.C. was on July 19, 1896, against Buenos Aires FC at Flores Ground. The stadium was also used by the Buenos Aires FC to play Rosario Athletic Club.

In 1900, the Old Ground hosted the Tie Cup final match when Belgrano A.C. beat Rosario A.C. by 2–0. The stadium would be used for another final game in 1904 when Rosario A.C. defeated Uruguayan team CURCC by 3–2.

In 1907 Flores Athletic sold some of its facilities to Club Ferro Carril Oeste, for m$n 700. The agreement included two fields, but it is unclear if the Old Ground was part of the transaction.

See also
 Flores Athletic Club

Notes

References

Sports venues in Buenos Aires
Defunct football venues in Argentina
Defunct rugby union venues
Multi-purpose stadiums in Argentina
1907 disestablishments in Argentina